American Outrage is a 2008 documentary directed by Beth Gage and George Gage. The film follows Shoshone tribe members Mary Dann and Carrie Dann in their dispute with the U.S. federal government over use of the Western Shoshone territory.

The film won Best Environmental Film at the Boulder International Film Festival in 2008.

References

External links 

 
American Outrage at Rotten Tomatoes

2008 films
American documentary films
2000s American films